Henri A. Termeer (February 28, 1946 – May 12, 2017) was a Dutch biotechnology executive and entrepreneur who is considered a pioneer in corporate strategy in the biotechnology industry for his tenure as CEO at Genzyme. Termeer created a business model adopted by many others in the biotech industry by garnering steep prices— mainly from insurers and government payers— for therapies for rare genetic disorders known as orphan diseases that mainly affect children. Genzyme uses biological processes to manufacture drugs that are not easily copied by generic-drug makers. The drugs are also protected by orphan drug acts in various countries which provides extensive protection from competition and ensures coverage by publicly funded insurers. As CEO of Genzyme from 1981 to 2011, he developed corporate strategies for growth including optimizing institutional embeddedness nurturing vast networks of influential groups and clusters: doctors, private equity, patient-groups, insurance, healthcare umbrella organizations, state and local government, and alumni. Termeer was "connected to 311 board members in 17 different organizations across 20 different industries" He has the legacy of being the "longest-serving CEO in the biotechnology industry.

He was an "advocate for the Massachusetts biotech industry." "To generate revenues to fund the research, Termeer entered into a number of side ventures including a chemical supplies business, a genetic counseling."

Termeer was named as one of the top fifty leaders of thought in orphan drugs and rare diseases in a list published by Terrapin for the World Orphan Drug Congress which included "eminent personalities that have advanced rare disease research."

Education
Termeer "studied economics at the Economische Hogeschool, Erasmus University, The Netherlands. In 1973 he completed his MBA at Darden School at the University of Virginia. He received an honorary Doctor of Science  from the University of Massachusetts.

Norvic
From 1969 to 1971 Termeer was a manager in management services in Norwich, United Kingdom, at the Norvic Company, a show company.

Baxter International
He began his career in the medical and healthcare product industry in 1973 when he started working as manager of international product planning for Deerfield, Illinois-based Travenol Laboratories Inc now Baxter. From 1975 to 1976 he was Baxter's international marketing manager. From 1976 to 1979 he was  general manager for Travenol GMBH in Munich.

From 1979 to 1981 he was executive vice president of the Hyland Therapeutics division of Baxter Travenol in Glendale, California. In the United States, plasma donors were paid for their time as the time commitment for regular donors is over 200 hours per year. Standards for donating plasma are set by the U.S. Food and Drug Administration (FDA). Almost all plasmapheresis in the US is performed by automated methods such as the Plasma Collection System (PCS2) made by Haemonetics or the Autopheresis-C (Auto-C) made by Fenwal, Inc., a former division of Baxter International. Termeer explained, "This was the beginning of biotechnology. You took plasma and pulled it apart, fractionated it. Hyland sold Factor VIII, Factor IX, immunoglobulins, and albumin. The plasma was collected through plasmapheresis performed at collection centers all around the country. They paid people for plasma. They returned the red cells and paid for the plasma ... There were ethical concerns about the payments. Very vulnerable people were being paid." At that time Baxter was developing tests for Chagas disease which was very prevalent in Latin America, based on feedback indicating that it would be a big market. Termeer was sent to South America to "figure out a way to set up the connections" which was how Baxter operated. After meeting with the military and with the Center for Disease Control he called off the project as unprofitable.

Back in Chicago he was Baxter's International Marketing Manager for several years with the "Artificial Organs Division—artificial kidneys, dialysis equipment, heart/lung machines, stuff like that. This was a period of pioneering work in dialysis and in the development of heart and lung machines for open heart surgeries.

Monica Higgins profiled Termeer as one of the alumni of the Baxter biopharmaceutical industryfirm, the 'Baxter boys'—who produced many of the leaders of the burgeoning biopharmaceutical industry. By 2004 Henri Termeer's leadership at Genzyme was considered "by many industry observers as exemplary and the firm, Genzyme, has often been seen as a role model for other firms in the industry."  Higgins noted in 2004 that at that time, [t]he size and extent of Baxter's influence overall [was] difficult to ascertain since the biotechnology industry, with eight- to ten-year product development cycles, [was] still in its relative infancy."

In December 2011, the non-partisan organization Public Campaign criticized Baxter for spending $10.45 million on lobbying and not paying any taxes during 2008–2010, instead getting $66 million in tax rebates, despite making a profit of $926 million.

Genzyme

According to the Boston Globe staff writer Robert Weisman,

In 1983 Termeer became chairman, CEO and president of Genzyme, a then two-year old start-up biotechnology company, located in Cambridge, Massachusetts. At that time,

In 1985 he was appointed as their CEO. By 1988 he was chairman of Genzyme. During those years he held positions at Genzyme in Genzyme Tissue Repair, Strategic Planning & Capital Allocation Committee and Member of Risk Oversight Committee, Genzyme Oncology.

When Genzyme needed a manufacturing facility, Termeer deliberately chose to remain in Massachusetts and use local contractors instead of using the pharmaceuticals cluster in the New Jersey and Philadelphia areas and their more specialized engineering firms. "Massachusetts is home to a vibrant biotechnology cluster, which draws on the region's strong universities, medical centers, and venture capital firms."

Harvard Business School professor, Michael E. Porter, a leading authority on competitive strategy and the competitiveness taught courses to newly appointed CEOs of very large corporations. Porter described Termeer's strategy as a cluster, the new economics of competition with all members benefiting from "a strong base of supporting functions and institutions." Under Termeer's leadership, Genzyme built a "critical mass" for its "cluster," in Massachusetts, a group of institutions that achieved unusual competitive success in the life sciences industry or biotechnology.

Specialty pharmacy
In 2005 Genzyme chose the specialty pharmacy division of PharmaCare, one of the largest pharmaceutical benefit management companies, as national network provider for Thyrogen, Genzyme's specialty drug.

Cerezyme and Gaucher's disease

In 1991 the first version of Genzyme's orphan drug Alglucerase (brand name Ceredase), the only treatment for Gaucher's disease, was approved by the FDA.

Termeer explained in a 2005 interview for The Wall Street Journal that in 1991 one treatment of Cerezyme for one patient took 22,000 placentas annually to manufacture, a difficult and expensive procedure.  According to the Congressional Office of Technology Assessment cerezyme cost $1.90 per unit including the cost of manufacturing, marketing and distribution. Genzyme charged $3.50 a unit.  Imiglucerase was granted orphan drug status in the US, Australia, and Japan.

By 1994 Genzyme had a new version of Cerezyme produced in genetically engineered cells in a process that was easier and cheaper. Although imiglucerase costs only less than 37 cents to manufacture, Genzyme charges $3.70 per unit making a 90% profit. The high price of the medication is part of Genzyme's business strategy in order for the biotech firm to undertake research and development for other drugs and to allow them to fund programs that distribute a small portion of production for free. So instead of lowering the price Termeer "decided to use the extra revenue to give additional Cerezyme away free in countries that can't afford to pay the high price. He said Genzyme gives away about 10% of the drug it produces." In order to ensure patients had access to Cerezyme, by 2005 Genzyme had hired 34 people to help patients acquire insurance plans that would cover the cost of their drugs. By 2005 there was still no competition for the drug and with patients desperate for a therapy, most insurers were willing to pay. Genzyme used the profits "to bring new treatments to market for two other rare diseases. It has purchased many small companies to expand into a diversified drug company with cancer, kidney disease and diagnostic products, among others."

By 2005 although Cerezyme cost the average patient (including babies) $200,000 a year, it could cost a single adult patient as much as $520,000 a year even though it cost Genzyme less than $52,000 to manufacture.  In 2005 there were only about 4,500 patients on Cerezyme.

Pompe disease
In 1998, two of Crowley's children, Megan and Patrick, were diagnosed with a severe neuromuscular disorder, glycogen storage disease type II, also called Pompe's disease. In the face of the children's deteriorating health, the family moved to Princeton, New Jersey, to be close to doctors specializing in the disease. Crowley worked at Bristol-Myers Squibb, where he held a number of management positions. Frustrated with the slow pace of research on Pompe's disease, Crowley left Bristol-Myers Squibb in March 2000, and took a position as CEO of Novazyme Pharmaceuticals, a biotechnology research company located in Oklahoma City founded by Dr.William Canfield, that was conducting research on a new experimental treatment for the disease.

Biotech executive john Crowley, whose two children were diagnosed in 1998 with Pompe's disease, had been a major force behind the search for a cure. By 2001 Genzyme when acquired Novazyme, Termeer put Crowley in charge Genzyme's global Pompe program, the largest R&D effort in the company's history, from September 2001 until December 2002. At that time Genzyme was considered to be the world's third largest biotechnology company, Genzyme's work eventually bore fruit and in January 2003, Crowley's children received the enzyme replacement therapy for Pompe disease developed by Genzyme. Crowley credits the experimental trial with saving his children's lives. The acquisition of Novazyme by Genzyme, and Crowley's fight to cure Pompe's Disease, was documented in the Harvard Business School Case Study, Novazyme: A Father's Love.

According to Higgins by 2004 Henri Termeer's leadership at Genzyme was celebrated by a number of biotech industry observers as exemplary. Genzyme, in 2004 was seen as a role model for other biotechnology firms.

According to The Wall Street Journal, in 2004 Termeer earned a combined salary and bonus of $3 million. He also had "options valued at between $12.6 million and $32 million in 10 years, based on appreciation of the company's stock of between 5% and 10% a year, according to the company's proxy."

In 2007 Genzyme acquired Bioenvision and the rights to the North American market for clofarabine, (brand name Clofarex), designated by the Food and Drug Administration (FDA)  as an orphan drug

In 2007 Termeer as CEO earned a salary of $2.5 million, and non-cash compensation worth $129 million.

From 2007 to 2008 under Termeer as CEO, Genzyme spent $2.8 million on lobbying.  In 2009 alone, Genzyme had 10 different organizations with a total of 49 lobbyists working on its behalf.

In 1981, before Termeer had joined Genzyme, it was a small firm that "employed 14 people in an office in Chinatown." By 2006 Genzyme with Termeer as CEO Genzyme became a biotech powerhouse with a "payroll of more than 8,000 in 70 offices and plants worldwide, making it the third-largest company of its kind." In 2004 "Termeer was the area's highest-paid CEO" in 2004, with a "total compensation package worth at least $37.9 million." He was 42nd in the 2006 list of Boston's wealthiest with a networth of $342 million.

In June 2009 Genzyme experienced a manufacturing disaster  after contamination with Vesivirus 2117 at their Allston, Massachusetts plant that resulted in shortages of Genzyme drugs including Cerezyme. Patients and shareholders depicted Genzyme corporate behaviour as irresponsible and arrogant. Genzyme was fined $175 million by the FDA for manufacturing deficiencies. Genzymes's competitors benefited and Genzyme stocks fell. As a result, 2011 Genzyme was acquired by Sanofi in an hostile takeover in October 2011—engineered in part by then-CEO of Sanofi, Christopher Viehbacher— for more than $20 billion. Termeer retired.

When Termeer left Genzyme his payout was valued at about $138 million, making him "one of the biggest all-time winners in biotech."

Biotechnology Industry Organization (BIO)

In 1993 Termeer helped bring about the creation of Biotechnology Industry Organization through the merger of two associations created in the 1980s, the Association of Biotechnology Companies (ABC)—an association of smaller start-ups and their business support network c—  and the Industrial Biotechnology Association (IBA)— an organization for the larger biotech firms. Termeer was on the board of directors of IBA. Termeer was concerned about potential health-care and FDA reform following the election of Bill Clinton in 1992. He wanted the biotechnology industry to speak with one voice. It was in 1997 while addressing 3,000 people at the BIO international meeting held in Houston that he realized that BIO needed to engage and include patient groups, religious groups, etc. Termeer claimed that BIO was more than lobbying. Under Termeer's leadership as BIO's CEO in 1997 the group successfully exerted pressure which culminated in passage of the Food and Drug Administration Modernization Act of 1997 with criteria "for fast-track drug development, allowed some drug approvals based on one pivotal trial, provided easier patient access to experimental drugs and devices, and renewed the Prescription Drug User Fee program." "The act was very, very helpful," he said. "We set up very good connections between BIO members and the FDA. I felt good about that."

In 2002 Termeer predicted that biotechnology could raise profits that can fund future research. He spoke of Gaucher's disease.

New England Healthcare Institute

In 2002 Termeer was instrumental in bringing together 20 other high-profile health care leaders, to found NEHI, a "nonprofit, applied research health policy organization", as the "New England Healthcare Institute." including Joshua Boger of Vertex Pharmaceuticals, Joseph B. Martin, MD, PhD, then Dean of Harvard Medical School, Samuel O. Thier, MD, then CEO, Partners HealthCare, Fred Telling, PhD, then VP of Corporate Policy and Strategic Management, Pfizer and Charlie Baker, CEO, Harvard Pilgrim Health Care. NEHI members include biotech and pharmaceutical companies, academic health centers, hospitals, medical device companies, employers, payers, patient groups, and others. Termeer was a Chairman Emeritus of the New England Healthcare Institute.

Massachusetts Council of Economic Advisors

In 2008 Governor Deval Patrick appointed Termeer to the Massachusetts Council of Economic Advisors.

Private equity

Erik Gordon from Ann Arbor, a University of Michigan business professor, remarked on Termeer's success "selling some of the world's most expensive medicines, priced from $200,000 to $300,000 a year" and suggested that following his retirement from Genzyme in 2011, Termeer may be hired by private-equity firms to "pitch deals. Ex-Wyeth CEO Bob Essner became a senior advisor with the Carlyle Group—a "behemoth in private-equity"— on the firm's health-care investments. Ex-CEO Fred Hassan of Schering-Plough Corporation has been working with private-equity firm Warburg Pincus LLC.

AVEO oncology
By 2012 Termeer was "chairman of cancer drug specialists Aveo Oncology ($AVEO).

Prosensa

In 2012 Termeer became strategic advisor for Prosensa, a venture-backed biotech to provide advice on corporate strategy and to lobby for Protensa, bringing his "experience in building Genzyme into a world leader in rare diseases." Prosensa's lead compound, a RNA therapy, 051, for an orphan disease known as Duchenne muscular dystrophy (DMD), is being developed by pharmaceutical giant, GlaxoSmithKline (GSK).  GSK, which also makes major investments in rare diseases and orphan drugs, licensed 051 in 2009 for "$25 million upfront and another $655 million in milestones." "Prosensa has a technology that could provide an array of RNA therapies for different variants of DMD, which affects about 1 in 3,500 male births and causes muscle wasting that leads to premature death." In 2012 Prosensa was listed by the industry news monitor Fierce Biotech's Fierce 15 as one of their top choices of pharmaceutical firms. Fierce Biotech covers biotechnology news including biopharma deals and clinical trials.

When Prosensa was founded in 2002 in Leiden, Netherlands with Hans Schikan as CEO, it was sustained for several years by patient groups—like Charlie's Funds— a non-profit foundation which provided funds for scientific research on DMD. Charlie's fund received over a million dollars from the documentary, Darius Goes West: The Roll of his Life a documentary about a young DMD patient, Darius Weems' 2005 fund-raising road-trip across the United States.
 When Prosensa CEO Hans Schikan served at Genzyme, he was "responsible for the global marketing and strategy development of the genetic disease portfolio of orphan medicinal products, which includes the first treatment for Pompe disease." Prosensa, like Genzyme focuses on rare inherited diseases.

By 2012 Propensa had accumulated €55 million in venture capital and had €47 million in the bank. Prosensa's experience in fundraising over the years has provided a model for other rare disease startups."

New Enterprise Associates contributed to Prosensa as its first entry into the European market.

Prosensa employs over 80 people. "The company attracted prominent life science ventures capitalists, including Life Science Partners, Abingworth and New Enterprise Associates (NEA), who led  E23m round last January, bringing David Mott, General Partner of NEA and formerly a key executive with MedImmune to the Supervisory Board. Also added to this Supervisory Board in recent months has been Henri Termeer, former chairman and CEO of Genzyme for some three decades."

ProQR 2014

The Dutch biotech startup ProQR Therapeutics BV, a start-up from Leiden, "licensed a compound from Boston scientists to develop a treatment" for cystic fibrosis focusing on the role of messenger RNA in cystic fibrosis. In 2013 ProQR's CEO Daniel de Boer, whose three-year-old son suffers from cystic fibrosis was introduced to Termeer in Boston by Dutch biotechnology leader Dinko Valerio. Termeer and Valerio are part of a group of well-connected biotech executives financially backing the Dutch biotech ProQR which was focused on the role of messenger RNA in cystic fibrosis and has now pivoted to inherited retinal diseases including Leber congenital amaurosis, Usher syndrome and retinitis pigmentosa. ProQR laid out its proposed terms for a $75 million IPO. ProQR planned "to sell 6.3 million shares at $11 to $13 a share." ProQR is competing with Vertex whose lead drug would serve the same patient population. Termeer and his group "expect to take the program all the way through to commercialization."

Moderna Therapeutics
In April 2013 Termeer joined the board of directors of Moderna Therapeutics, a Cambridge-based biotech company that is developing a platform technology for delivery of mRNA. The company creates synthetic mRNA that can be injected into patients to help them create their own therapies. By December 2012 Moderna Therapeutics received $40 million "financing led by Flagship Ventures and a consortium of private investors."

CANbridge
In September 2013 China's CANbridge, which commercializes Western clinical stage pharmaceutical products in China, appointed Termeer as Chief Advisor of their Life Sciences Advisory Board.

Mentorship
In 2015, from his home office in Marblehead, Massachusetts overlooking Marblehead Harbor, Termeer continued to mentor former Genzyme colleagues who are now CEOs of about two dozen smaller companies. Among this group of elite biotech entrepreneurs — the "Genzyme diaspora"— are Geoff McDonough, now CEO of Generation Bio, Gail Maderis, who runs biotechnology firms and an industry trade group in the San Francisco Bay area, Tom Mathers, CEO at CoLucid Pharmaceuticals Inc, Jeff Albers has a Cambridge-based startup, Blueprint Medicines Corporation and Greg Madison, CEO of New York's Keryx Biopharmaceuticals Inc.

Awards

 1990–1992 The Wall Street Transcript Gold Award
 1995 Success Magazine  'Renegade of the Year'
 1999 Golden Door award from the International Institute of New England, an award that symbolizes the positive influence that immigrants have had on America.
 2003 Cor Vitae Award from the American Heart Association
 In 2005 Genzyme received the National Medal of Technology and Innovation, the highest honor awarded by the President of the United States for technological innovation. Termeer accepted the award on behalf of Genzyme "For pioneering dramatic improvements in the health of thousands of patients with rare diseases and harnessing the promise of biotechnology to develop innovative new therapies."
 2007 Ernst & Young Entrepreneur of the Year Award
 2008 Biotechnology Heritage Award, from the Biotechnology Industry Organization (BIO) and the Chemical Heritage Foundation

Global Genes RARE Project Champions of Hope

In 2012 Termeer received the Lifetime Achievement Award  from Nicole Boice, founder and CEO, Global Genes R.A.R.E Project. He was honoured for leading Genzyme for nearly 30 years and helping "to establish Massachusetts as a major center of industrial biotech research and development," for "spearheading the development of rare disease treatments at a time when other pharmaceutical companies were focusing on drugs for much larger patient populations."

Academic
 1999 Fellow of the American Academy of Arts and Sciences
 1999 Genetic Disease Foundation Humanitarian Award
 2005 Honorary Fellowship at the British Royal College of Physicians

Other affiliations
Termeer was "connected to 311 board members in 17 different organizations across 20 different industries" including AutoImmune Inc., Diacrin, Inc., rEVO Biologics, Inc., Allergan Inc., Genzyme Corporation, Tekla Life Sciences Investors, AVEO Pharmaceuticals, Partners HealthCare System, Federal Reserve Bank of Boston, Biotechnology Industry Organization, Erasmus University, Capital Royalty, Federal Reserve Bank of Atlanta, Colgate W. Darden Graduate School of Business Administration, Longwood Founders Management, Verastem, Moderna Therapeutics, ProQR Therapeutics, CANbridge Life Sciences and the Fellows of Harvard Medical School Termeer serves on their board of directors.

Lysosomal Therapeutics

Termeer provided financial backing for Lysosomal Therapeutics or N.V.Lysosomal Therapeutics Inc., a fledgling biotech firm in Boston, developing a treatment for Parkinson's and other neurodegenerative diseases. According to Bloomberg Termeer is the founder of Lysosomal Therapeutics. Termeer was mentoring Lysosomal Therapeutics CEO Dimitri Krainc, who is a neurologist at Massachusetts General Hospital and is originally from Slovenia. According to Krainc, he and Termeer were in "contact by e-mail, phone, or in person weekly. ... It's fun to meet with Henri. He listens. He's got incredibly good judgment. And he's very focused on the patients."

Philanthropy

Massachusetts General Hospital
Termeer $10 million donation. funds research at the Henri and Belinda Termeer Center for Targeted Therapies at the Massachusetts General Hospital Cancer Center where patients with early and advanced stage cancers enroll in "its fast-growing portfolio of Phase I, Phase II and Phase III clinical trials." Termeer was on the board of directors of the MGH and had served on numerous committees with Peter Slavin, Hospital director.

In 2011 Termeer Cathy Minehan, and Chad Gifford— fellow Partners HealthCare Board Members— co-chaired the Massachusetts General Hospital bicentennial. The gala, with 1,000 in attendance, also served as a fundraiser, raising approximately $1 million.

Popular culture
The 2010 Hollywood film entitled Extraordinary Measures starring Harrison Ford as John Crowley
 working at Genzyme Corporation in Cambridge with Henri Termeer as CEO. It is allegedly based on the true story behind Genzyme's development of Myozyme for the treatment for Pompe disease, a rare enzyme deficiency. Boston Globe staffer Geeta Anand wrote a book on the topic called The Cure.

Crowley was profiled in The Wall Street Journal by Pulitzer Prize-winning journalist Geeta Anand.  Anand expanded the profile of Crowley into a book published in 2006, The Cure: How a Father Raised $100 Million – And Bucked the Medical Establishment – In a Quest to Save His Children.

Harrison Ford and Double Feature films optioned the rights to produce a film inspired by Anand's book and the Crowley family. In April 2009, CBS Films began filming this major motion picture about the Crowley family's quest to save their children's lives. The film, titled Extraordinary Measures was released nationwide on January 22, 2010. Directed by Tom Vaughan, Extraordinary Measures stars Brendan Fraser as John Crowley and Keri Russell as Aileen Crowley, and also executive producer Harrison Ford as "Dr. Robert Stonehill" who is a composite character based primarily on Dr. William Canfield and inspired as well by other doctors Crowley worked with.

References

1946 births
2017 deaths
University of Virginia Darden School of Business alumni
American chief executives
Fellows of the American Academy of Arts and Sciences
People from Tilburg
Dutch emigrants to the United States
Erasmus University Rotterdam alumni